The Passion of Vincent van Gogh is an opera in three acts and eighteen scenes by composer Christopher Yavelow. The opera was commissioned by the National Endowment for the Arts and composed at the Camargo Foundation in 1983 during a Camargo Fellowship in Cassis, France. The English libretto by the composer is taken from the letters of Vincent van Gogh (with permission from the Vincent van Gogh Foundation), Paul Gauguin's journal, and additional official documents relating to Vincent van Gogh. Each line is footnoted in the score and libretto. A German translation by Monique Fasel appears in both the score and libretto. Research for the opera was supported by the International Research and Exchanges Board (IREX) and by the American Council of Learned Societies and the Social Science Research Council. An abridged version of the opera premiered at the University of Texas at Dallas on April 14, 1984.

References

Operas by Christopher Yavelow
English-language operas
Operas
1984 operas
Cultural depictions of Vincent van Gogh